Natalya Zhukova (born July 19, 1992) is a Russian cross-country skier.  She competed at the 2014 Winter Olympics in Sochi, in skiathlon and women's classical.

Cross-country skiing results
All results are sourced from the International Ski Federation (FIS).

Olympic Games

World Championships

World Cup

Season standings

References

External links
Natalia Zhukova at FIS

1992 births
Living people
Cross-country skiers at the 2014 Winter Olympics
Olympic cross-country skiers of Russia
Sportspeople from Kazan
Russian female cross-country skiers